The Masmuda (Berber: ⵉⵎⵙⵎⵓⴷⵏ) is a Berber tribal confederation of Morocco and one of the largest in the Maghreb, along with the Zenata and the Sanhaja. They were composed of several sub-tribes: Berghouatas, Ghomaras (Ghomarids), Hintatas (Hafsids), Tin Malel, Hergha, Genfisa, Seksiwa, Gedmiwa, Hezerdja, Urika, Guerouanes, Bni M'tir, Hezmira, Regraga, Haha les Banou Maghus, Gilawa and others. Today, the Masmuda confederacy largely corresponds to the speakers of the Shilha (Tachelhit) Berber variety, whereas other clans, such as Regraga have adopted Arabic.

History
The Masmuda settled large parts of Morocco, and were largely sedentary and practised agriculture. The residence of the Masmuda aristocracy was Aghmat in the High Atlas mountains. From the 10th century the Berber tribes of the Sanhaja and Zanata groups invaded the lands of the Masmuda, followed from the 12th century onwards by Arab Bedouins (see Banu Hilal).

Ibn Tumart united the Masmuda tribes at the beginning of the 12th century and founded the Almohad movement, which subsequently unified the whole of the Maghreb and Andalusia. After the downfall of the Almohads, however, the particularism of the Masmuda peoples prevailed once more, as a result of which they lost their political significance.

Sub-tribes
The anonymous author of the Kitāb Mafāk̲h̲ir al-Barbar (roughly translates as "The Book of the Glories of the Berbers"), a work compiled in 1312, cites the sub-tribes of the Masmuda as follows: 
Haha
Regraga
Ourika
Hezmira
Guedmiwa
Henfisa
Hezerga
Doukkala
Hintata
Beni Magus
Tehlawa

References

See also
Banu Dānis (Masmuda clan in al-Andalus)
Hintata

 
Berber peoples and tribes
Ethnic groups in Morocco
Moroccan tribes
Berbers in Morocco
Former confederations